Farewell Again is a 1937 British drama film directed by Tim Whelan and starring Leslie Banks, Flora Robson, Sebastian Shaw and Robert Newton. The film is a portmanteau illustrating the calls of duty on various soldiers and their families. In the United States it was released with the alternative title Troopship.

The film was made at Denham Studios by Alexander Korda's London Film Productions.

Cast
 Leslie Banks as Colonel Harry Blair
 Flora Robson as Lucy Blair
 Sebastian Shaw as Captain Gilbert Reed
 Patricia Hilliard as Ann Harrison
 Robert Cochran as Carlisle
 Anthony Bushell as Roddy Hammond
 Rene Ray as Elsie Wainwright
 Robert Newton as Jim Carter
 Leonora Corbett as Lady Joan
 J.H. Roberts as Doctor Pearson
 Eliot Makeham as Major Swayle
 Martita Hunt as Adela Swayle
 Edward Lexy as Sergeant Brough
 Maire O'Neill as Mrs Brough
 Wally Patch as Sergeant Major Pearson
 Margaret Moffatt as Mrs Billings
 Gertrude Musgrove as Lily Toff
 Alf Goddard as Private Bulger
 John Laurie as Private McAllister
 Jerry Verno as Private Judd
 William Hartnell in Minor role

References

Bibliography
 Low, Rachael. Filmmaking in 1930s Britain. George Allen & Unwin, 1985.
 Wood, Linda. British Films, 1927-1939. British Film Institute, 1986.

External links

1937 films
British drama films
1937 drama films
London Films films
Films directed by Tim Whelan
Films set in England
Films scored by Richard Addinsell
British black-and-white films
Films produced by Erich Pommer
Films produced by Alexander Korda
Films with screenplays by Patrick Kirwan
Films shot at Denham Film Studios
1930s English-language films
1930s British films